Sun Ke (born 26 August 1989) is a Chinese professional footballer who currently plays for Chinese Super League club  Shenzhen.

Club career
Sun Ke started his football career playing for second tier side Jiangsu Sainty in 2006. By the 2008 season, he would play in 22 league games and score two goals as he was part of the team that won the second tier league title and promotion to the top flight. Within the top tier, Sun found it hard to gain significant playing time until the 2011 season when he started to establish himself as a regular for the first team which soon culminated in his first goal in over two years when he scored on 14 September 2011 in a 2-0 win against Hangzhou Greentown.

On 18 June 2015, Sun transferred to fellow Chinese Super League side Tianjin Teda. However, due to complications with the club's sponsor Quanjian, the transfer was suddenly put on hold and Sun returned to Jiangsu. By 12 January 2016, Quanjian had left their sponsorship with Tianjin Teda and moved it to Tianjin Quanjian, which saw Sun transferred to China League One side Tianjin Quanjian for a record-breaking domestic transfer fee of an estimated ¥66 million. He made his debut and scored his first goal for the club on 13 March 2016 in a 3-0 win against Qingdao Huanghai. He immediately established himself as a vital member of the team as they won the 2016 China League One division and promotion to the top tier.

In July 2020, Sun was one of eight former Tianjin Tianhai players to sign with Shenzhen FC. He would go on to make his debut for the club on 4 August 2020 in a league game against Guangzhou Evergrande Taobao F.C. that ended in a 3-1 defeat.

International career
Sun was called up to the Chinese national team for the first time in March 2013. He made his debut on 22 March 2013 in a 1-0 win against Iraq during 2015 AFC Asian Cup qualification. He scored a dramatic game-tying goal on 21 July 2013 in a 3-3 draw against Japan at the 2013 EAFF East Asian Cup.

On 24 December 2014, Sun was named in China's squad for the 2015 AFC Asian Cup in Australia. In the team's second group match, he scored the winning goal as China won 2-1 against Uzbekistan to qualify for the knockout stage.

Career statistics

Club statistics
.

International statistics

International goals
 
Scores and results list China's goal tally first.

Honours

Club
Jiangsu Sainty
China League One: 2008
Chinese FA Super Cup: 2013
Chinese FA Cup: 2015

Tianjin Quanjian
China League One: 2016

References

External links
Player profile at Sodasoccer.com

1989 births
Living people
Chinese footballers
Sportspeople from Xuzhou
Footballers from Jiangsu
Jiangsu F.C. players
Tianjin Tianhai F.C. players
Shenzhen F.C. players
Chinese Super League players
China League One players
China international footballers
2015 AFC Asian Cup players
Association football wingers